The 2006–07 Persian Gulf Cup (also known as Iran Pro League) was the 24th season of Iran's Football League and sixth as Iran Pro League since its establishment in 2001. Esteghlal were the defending champions. The season featured 14 teams from the 2005–06 Iran Pro League and two new teams promoted from the 2005–06 Azadegan League: Mes Kerman as champions and Paykan as runner-up. The league started on 9 September 2006 and ended on 28 May 2007. Saipa won the Pro League title for the first time in their history (total third Iranian title).

Participating in international competitions 
2007 AFC Champions League
Esteghlal
Sepahan

Final classification

Results table

Player statistics

Top goalscorers

Top Assists

Cards

Matches played
30
  Morteza Asadi (Saba Battery)
  Ali Yahyanejad (Rah Ahan)

Attendance

Average home attendance

Highest attendance

Notes:Updated to games played on 28 May 2007. Source: iplstats.com

References
Iran Pro League Statistics: 2006–2007 Season
Persian League
Persian Football
Pars Football 

Iran Pro League seasons
Iran
1